Eubranchidae is a taxonomic family of sea slugs, marine gastropod molluscs in the superfamily Aeolidioidea, the aeolid nudibranchs.

Taxonomic history
The genera in this family were moved to the family Fionidae as a result of a molecular phylogenetics study. This was reversed in 2017 with further DNA evidence and a re-interpretation of genus and family characteristics.

Genera and species
Genera and species within the family Eubranchidae include:
 Aenigmastyletus Martynov, 1998
 Aenigmastyletus alexei Martynov, 1998
 Amphorina Quatrefages, 1844
 Capellinia Trinchese, 1874
 Eubranchopsis
 Eubranchopsis virginalis Baba, 1949
 Eubranchus Forbes, 1838 - 44 species
 Galvinella Eliot, 1907
 Galvinella antarctica Eliot, 1907
 Leostyletus Martynov, 1998
 Leostyletus misakiensis (Baba, 1960)
 Leostyletus pseudomisakiensis Martynov, 1998

Subfamilies and genera brought into synonymy:
 Dunga Eliot, 1902: synonym of Eubranchus Forbes, 1838
 Egalvina Odhner, 1929: synonym of Eubranchus Forbes, 1838
 Galvina Alder & Hancock, 1855: synonym of Eubranchus Forbes, 1838
 Nudibranchus Martynov, 1998: synonym of Eubranchus Forbes, 1838
 Produnga Martynov, 1998: synonym of Eubranchus Forbes, 1838

References